The 2021 Copa Federación de España was the 29th edition of the Copa Federación de España, also known as Copa RFEF, a knockout competition for Spanish football clubs.

The competition began in August with the first games of the regional stages and ended in November with the final of the national tournament. As part of the new competition format started in 2019, the four semifinalists qualified to the Copa del Rey first round.

Regional tournaments

Andalusia tournament
The Royal Andalusian Football Federation (RFAF) decided to create the 'Copa RFAF' in 2020. The finalists of this competition were selected as the Andalusian representatives in the Copa Federación national phase. The tournament started August 22nd.

Final

Aragon tournament
Eight teams joined the tournament: Barbastro (5), Belchite 97 (5), Binéfar (5), Borja (5), Calamocha (5), Cuarte (5), Ejea (4) and Utebo (5). The group phase started 11 August.

Group 1

Group 2

Final

Asturias tournament
12 teams joined the competition. The draw was made August 2nd and the tournament started August 7th. Semifinals and final were played between August 28th and September 8th in the same venue.

Group stage

Group A

Group B

Group C

Group D

Knockout stage
The knockout stage matches were played at Estadio Sergio Sánchez, in El Berrón, Siero.

Final

Balearic Islands tournament
Formentera (4), Peña Deportiva (4), Platges de Calvià (5), Poblense (5) and Sant Jordi (5) joined the tournament.

Final

Basque Country tournament
Leioa was directly selected by the Basque Football Federation.

Canary Islands tournament
Tenisca (5) and Unión Viera (5) joined the tournament.

Cantabria tournament
Eight teams joined the tournament. All matches were played at El Malecón stadium, in Torrelavega.

Final

Castile-La Mancha tournament
Ten teams joined the XX Trofeo Junta de Comunidades de Castilla-La Mancha. Atlético Albacete, as reserve team, can not qualify for the national stage.

Final

Castile and León tournament
Six teams joined the tournament.
Burgos Promesas, as reserve team, can not qualify for the national stage.

Final

Guijuelo qualifies to National Phase because Burgos Promesas is the reserve team of Burgos.

Catalonia tournament
Lleida Esportiu (4) and Sant Andreu (5) joined the tournament.

Ceuta tournament
Betis de Hadú was directly selected by Federación de Fútbol de Ceuta due to sporting merits.

Extremadura tournament
13 teams joined the tournament.

Final

Galicia tournament
A total of 15 teams joined the regional phase of the RFEF Cup for the 2021/2022 season.

Final

La Rioja tournament
Eight teams joined the tournament.

Final

Madrid tournament
Copa Real Federación Madrileña de Fútbol (RFFM) was one stage of the qualifying tournament. The winner of Copa RFFM qualified to the semifinals with Las Rozas (5), Móstoles URJC (4) and Navalcarnero (4). 8 teams joined Copa RFFM, starting August 15th: Alcorcón B (5), Carabanchel (5), Fuenlabrada B (5), Moratalaz (5), Parla (5), Pozuelo (5), Rayo Vallecano B (5) and Torrejón (5).

Group 1

Group 2

Final Copa RFFM
As Fuenlabrada B is a reserve team and cannot qualify to national stage, Torrejón continues in the tournament.

Final Knockout stage

Final

Melilla tournament
Melilla was directly selected by Real Federación Melillense de Fútbol due to sporting merits.

Murcia tournament
Four teams joined the tournament.

Final

Navarre tournament
Eight teams joined the tournament.

Final

Valencian Community tournament
8 teams joined the tournament.

Final

National phase
National phase was played between October and December with 32 teams (20 winners of the Regional Tournaments and the best 12 teams of 2020-21 Segunda División B not qualified to 2021–22 Copa del Rey). The four semifinalists qualified to 2021–22 Copa del Rey's first round.

Qualified teams

Best teams from 2020–21 Segunda División B not qualified to 2021–22 Copa del Rey
 Arenas de Getxo (4)
 Córdoba (4)
 Costa Brava (3)
 Ebro (4)
 Hércules (4)
 Langreo (4)
 Linense (3)
 Mérida (4)
 Murcia (4)
 Numancia (4)
 Racing Santander (3)
 Villanovense (4)

Winners of Autonomous Communities tournaments
 Alfaro (5)
 Alondras (5)
 Atzeneta (5)
 Avilés (4)
 Betis de Hadú (6)
 Ejea (4)
 Gimnásica Torrelavega (5)
 Guijuelo (5)
 Izarra (4)
 Juventud Torremolinos (5)
 Leioa (5)
 Lleida Esportiu (4)
 Melilla (4)
 Moralo (5)
 Navalcarnero (4)
 Peña Deportiva (4)
 Tenisca (5)
 Toledo (4)
 Xerez (5)
 Yeclano (5)

Draw
The draw for the entire tournament was made at the RFEF headquarters on September 24th. The teams were divided into four pots based on geographical criteria. Each pot was played independently until the semi-finals.

Bracket

Round of 32
Pot A

Pot B

Pot C

Pot D

Round of 16
Pot A

Pot B

Pot C

Pot D

Quarter-finals
Winners qualified to the 2021–22 Copa del Rey first round.
Pot A

Pot B

Pot C

Pot D

Semi-finals

Final

Top goalscorers

References

Copa Federación de España seasons
2021–22 in Spanish football cups